The bombings of Malmö and Lund were two violations of Sweden's neutrality during World War II in which bombs were dropped from British aircraft on Swedish soil.

Bombing of Malmö
On October 3, 1940 early in the morning, three bombs were dropped over Malmö, in neutral Sweden by an Armstrong Whitworth Whitley bomber of the Royal Air Force. The explosions caused relatively minor damage to nearby buildings. Britain claimed initially not to be involved with the bombing, but convincing evidence led to a recognition of the incident. The bombing raid was said to have been intended against Stettin in Germany (now Szczecin in Poland).

Bombing of Lund 1943 
On November 18, 1943 British aircraft dropped some fifty bombs over Lund. Two of them hit the Sydkraft electrical transformer station, and in the outskirts of the city a bomb explosion opened a large crater. Thousands of windows were shattered and several greenhouses were destroyed, but no people were injured.

References 
 Sydsvenskan 18 December 2001

1940 in Sweden
1943 in Sweden
Conflicts in 1940
Conflicts in 1943
1940s in Malmö